Kyle Orlando Massey (born August 28, 1991), also known mononymously as Massey, is an American actor and rapper. He starred in the Disney Channel sitcoms That's So Raven and its spin-off Cory in the House, in which he played Cory Baxter. Massey starred in the Disney Channel Original Movie Life Is Ruff. Massey has released several rap songs for Walt Disney Records and Hollywood Records. He provided the voice of Milo in the Disney animated series Fish Hooks and was the runner-up on the 11th season of ABC's Dancing with the Stars. He is the younger brother of actor Christopher Massey.

Career

Acting 
Starting in 2003, Massey played Cory Baxter on the Disney Channel show That's So Raven for four seasons, and then headlined its 2007 spinoff Cory in the House.  Massey also starred in the 2005 Disney Channel Original Movie Life Is Ruff. He also voices the character of the fish Milo on the Disney Channel's Fish Hooks. Massey also played a role of PJ Watson in 3 episodes of the PBS children's educational series The Electric Company.

Music 
Massey appeared on the Disney Channel Holiday soundtrack and the Shaggy Dog soundtrack where he performed "Who Let The Dog Out" and "Jingle Bells (a Hip-Hop Carol)". He sang the theme song for Cory in the House. Massey also raps a song called "It's a Dog" on the Life is Ruff soundtrack. He also sang the theme song for Yin Yang Yo!. Massey and his brother Christopher Massey have performed rap as the duo, The Massey Boyz. He also sang the music video for Disney's Underdog.

On June 12, 2016, Massey was featured using his surname as a mononym on the song 'Verse' by Lebanese-American rapper Skate, making it the first time in nearly 10 years since Massey has done anything musically. Massey also owns a SoundCloud account where he uploads new original music, with his latest song being "Finess."

Dancing with the Stars 
Massey was a contestant on the 11th season of Dancing with the Stars, which premiered on September 20, 2010. He and his professional partner Lacey Schwimmer finished as the runners-up in the competition. Massey's final dance was a freestyle to the song "Tootsie Roll" by the 69 Boys. He was praised by all the judges, being dubbed the "Fresh Prince of DWTS".

In 2012, Massey and Schwimmer appeared in the Dancing with the Stars live show in Las Vegas, Nevada.

Personal life 
Massey is the younger brother of actor Christopher Massey, who plays Michael Barret in the television series Zoey 101.

Assault by Lil Twist 
In March 2015 Lil Twist was arrested and charged with several crimes after he and four others assaulted Massey and his brother Christopher. On December 1, 2016, Twist pleaded no contest to six charges and received a one-year jail sentence.

2021 criminal charges 

On June 29, 2021, Massey was charged in King County, Washington on one count of immoral communication with a minor, where he allegedly sent lewd photos to a 13-year-old girl. The criminal charge came after a 2019 lawsuit whose allegations Massey denied, saying that the lawsuit was an extortion attempt, and that in early 2019 the attorneys representing the minor had demanded $1.5 million threatening to go public with the allegation if he did not comply. The lawsuit also stated that Massey had known the accuser since she was four years old.

Discography 
 "It's a Dog" – Life Is Ruff (2005)
 "Yin Yang Yo! Theme Song" – Yin Yang Yo! (2006)
 "Cory in the House Theme Song" – Cory in the House (2007)
 "Underdog Raps" – Underdog: Original Soundtrack (2007)
 "Jingle Bells (A Hip Hop Carol)" – Disney Channel Holiday (2007)
 "Finess (featuring Skate)" – single (2016)

Filmography

References

External links 

 

1991 births
Living people
Male actors from Atlanta
American male child actors
American child musicians
American male television actors
American male voice actors
Participants in American reality television series
Rappers from Atlanta
20th-century American male actors
21st-century American male actors
African-American male actors
African-American male rappers
21st-century American rappers
21st-century American male musicians
People charged with sex crimes
20th-century African-American people
21st-century African-American musicians